Wendell Gaskin (born January 7, 1973) is a retired American sprinter who specialized in the 400 metres.

He finished sixth in the 400 metres at the 1995 Pan American Games, and also won a silver medal in the 4 × 100 metres relay at the same games.

His personal best time was 45.29 seconds, achieved in June 1994 in Knoxville. He also had 10.21 seconds in the 100 metres, achieved in May 1993 in Odessa; and 20.71 seconds in the 200 metres, achieved in May 1996 in Westwood.

References

1973 births
Living people
American male sprinters
Pan American Games medalists in athletics (track and field)
Pan American Games silver medalists for the United States
Athletes (track and field) at the 1995 Pan American Games
Medalists at the 1995 Pan American Games